The Chinese Ambassador to Mali is the official representative of the People's Republic of China to the Republic of Mali.

List of representatives

References 

 
China
Mali